Vanimal or Vanimel is a village located in the Kozhikode district of Kerala, India. Bhoomivathukkal is the current business center of Vanimal village and Vayalpeedika is the Heritage city which was the main commercial hub during 1970-'90. The Panchayath is renowned as Vanimal and the actual Vanimal Desam is in Vayalpeedika adjacent to Verkadavu Desams which lays on the both sides of Vayalpeedika city. The famous Vanimal Juma masjid is situated in Vayalpeedika.

The literacy rate in Vanimal is more when it compared to other villages of Calicut district. This credit belongs not only to one of the biggest high school in the district namely "Crescent High School Vanimal" but also other two high schools government higher secondary school in Velliyode and St. George's H.S. Vilangad.

Crescent Higher Secondary School Vanimal, is located in Bhoomivathukkal, is the biggest and one of the oldest educational institution in the Village, consisting of more than 1,800 students and 75 staffs. More than 80% of the total teachers in this school belong to the same village, Vanimal. It highlights the importance of educational awareness of the people of this village. There are many famous personalities in various field from Vanimal. At present the village is socially and educationally well developed.

Demographics
 India census, Vanimal had a population of 23,368 with 11,458 males and 11,910 females.

Politics
Vanimal is a part of Nadapuram assembly constituency, which is part of Vatakara (Lok Sabha constituency).

References

Villages in Kozhikode district
Vatakara area